Caleb Martin Foote (born December 23, 1993) is an American actor best known for his role in the television series The Kids Are Alright.

He received the San Diego Theatre Critics Circle 2017 Craig Noel Award for Outstanding Male Performance for his role in Hand to God.

Biography 
Foote acted at a young age in various theatre productions. From age 7 to 14, he was raised on Montserrat, a volcanic island in the Caribbean. He attended University of Michigan, where he received a Bachelor of Fine Arts degree in acting in 2016.

Following graduation, Foote appeared in several stage productions, including Luis Valdez' 2017 production of Zoot Suit  and the San Diego Repertory Theatre's 2017 production of Hand to God. Critics wrote of Hand to God, "Caleb Foote gives a virtuosic performance, changing his voice and manner (he’s so withdrawn and tic-riddled as Jason, so harsh and antagonistic as Tyrone), while deftly manipulating a puppet with both hands, and discoursing with himself in rapid-fire, angry, funny ways. ... It’s a neck-snapping, challenge, [sic] and it’s thrilling to watch." "Caleb Foote as Jason and Tyrone is remarkable in balancing performances as both the cowering Jason and the aggressive Tyrone. ... there is a marked difference between the two performances. When Jason speaks it is a plea, when Tyrone speaks it is a bark with teeth"; "this is hand puppet Tyrone’s show all the way, which makes this young Foote’s show"; "Foote plays Tyrone, too, with an unearthly way of voicing him that swoops from the guttural to the sing-song. All the while, the actor is also managing Tyrone’s very expressive physical antics while maintaining both sides of conversations between puppet and master. ... It’s an extraordinary performance". For this performance, Foote the San Diego Theatre Critics Circle 2017 Craig Noel Award for Outstanding Male Performance.

Filmography

Film and video

Television

Selected stage appearances

References

External links 
 Caleb Foote on IMDb
 The Kids Are Alright bio

1993 births
21st-century American male actors
Living people
Male actors from Michigan
People from Ypsilanti, Michigan
University of Michigan School of Music, Theatre & Dance alumni